Lin Junq-tzer (born 1944) is a Taiwanese politician who has served as the Governor of Taiwan Province from 26 February 2010 to 20 May 2016.

Early life
A Hakka born in Hsinchu, Lin obtained his bachelor's degree in business administration from Soochow University in 1967 and master's degree in educational administration in 1989.

Early career
After finishing his bachelor's degree from Soochow University, Lin taught as a teacher at Zhudong Junior High School in Hsinchu County in 1968-1969.

Early political career
On 23 December 1972, Lin joined the legislative election and won a member seat at Hsinchu County Council. In 1981, he became the delegate for National Assembly.

Hsinchu City Mayor
Lin was elected as the Mayor of Hsinchu City after winning the 2001 Republic of China local election under Kuomintang on 1 December 2001 and took office on 20 December 2001.

He was then re-elected by a near 40% margin as the mayor after winning the 2005 Republic of China local election on 3 December 2005 and took office on 20 December 2005.

References

Chairpersons of the Taiwan Provincial Government
Living people
1944 births
Scouting in Taiwan
Soochow University (Taiwan) alumni
Taiwanese politicians of Hakka descent
Mayors of Hsinchu
Members of the 3rd Legislative Yuan
Members of the 4th Legislative Yuan
Kuomintang Members of the Legislative Yuan in Taiwan
Chairpersons of the Kuomintang